The Woman Eater (also known as Womaneater on its original UK release) is a low budget 1958 British horror film directed by Charles Saunders and starring George Coulouris and Vera Day. Produced by Guido Coen, the film recounts the story of a crazed scientist who feeds women to a flesh-eating tree in return for a serum that can bring the dead back to life. The film was released in the UK in 1958 by Eros Films on a double bill with the Swedish crime drama Blonde in Bondage (1957).

Plot
At the Explorers' Club in London, Dr Moran (George Coulouris) tells the other members about 'a tribe in the depths of the Amazon jungle' which has 'a miracle-working JuJu that can bring the dead back to life' and that he's going on an expedition to get it. He finds the tribe and witnesses a secret ceremony in which a young woman (Marpessa Dawn), entranced by beating drums, is consumed by a large carnivorous tree. Moran then nearly dies from 'jungle fever'.

Five years later, recovered and back in Britain at his manor house, Moran is experimenting with the tree. He has brought it and the tribal drummer, Tanga (Jimmy Vaughan), back from the Amazon. They kidnap a young English woman, Susan Curtis (Sara Leighton), and Tanga feeds her to the tree. 'She'll become a part of the plant. And from it I'll get the serum to bring the dead back to life. She won't have died in vain', declares Moran. However, the experiment fails. A dead heart into which Moran injects the serum revives, but dies again after a short time.

Police Sgt Bolton (Edward Higgins) arrives via bicycle to gently question Moran about the missing Susan. Moran denies any knowledge of her. That night, at the local Fun Fair, Sally Norton (Vera Day), is working at a sideshow, dancing the 'hula-hula' to attract customers. When she takes a break, Jack Venner (Peter Wayn), who has fallen in love with her at first sight, introduces himself. But when the sideshow barker (Harry Ross) tries to drag Sally back to the show, Jack bests him in a fistfight, which costs Sally her job. Jack suggests that she see Moran about becoming an assistant to Moran's housekeeper, Margaret Santor (Joyce Gregg). Moran gives Sally the job over the objections of Margaret.

After the suspicious Detective Inspector Brownlow (Maxwell Foster) questions Moran again about Susan's disappearance, Moran and Tanga extract more serum from the tree, although without a further sacrifice. Moran says that his English science can improve Tanga's juju, but Tanga is sceptical. Moran goes to London and picks up Judy (Joy Webster). Tanga feeds her to the tree, too.

Moran offers Margaret's job to Sally, telling her that Margaret is dead. Margaret and Moran had been lovers before he went to the Amazon. She still loved him, but Moran said that he was tired of her 'middle aged jealousies' over the younger Sally, whom Margaret has correctly guessed that Moran is in love with. Moran strangled Margaret when she tried to stab him.

Sally tells Jack that she's frightened of Moran and will quit the next morning. But Moran refuses to let her go and confesses his love for her. Sally is appalled. Moran locks her in his laboratory. When Jack comes to find her, Moran tells him that she's left. Jack and Moran argue about Sally's whereabouts, and Jack goes to the police with his suspicions. The police have new evidence about Susan's disappearance - a torn shred of her dress found near Moran's house - and they and Jack go off to confront Moran.

In the laboratory, Moran brings Margaret back to life. She starts to attack Sally but drops dead before she can do Sally any harm. Moran ponders this, saying, 'Only a body. No mind'. Then he yells at Tanga, 'Your people cheated me! They gave me only half the secret!' He can raise the dead, but the result is a mindless zombie. Tanga, hands on hips, says defiantly, 'Our secret not for you. The brain for us only'.

Tanga then tries to feed Sally to the tree but fails. Jack and the police arrive as Moran and Tanga struggle. Sally escapes with Jack. Moran hurls a vial of liquid onto the tree and, as it bursts into flames, flees. Tanga throws his knife, killing Moran, then kneels before the burning tree, worshipping it as it's consumed by fire.

Cast 
As listed in the end credits:
 George Coulouris as Dr Moran
 Robert MacKenzie as Lewis Carling
 Norman Claridge as Dr Paterson
 Marpessa Dawn as Native Girl
 Jimmy Vaughan as Tanga
 Sara Leighton as Susan Curtis
 Edward Higgins [credited as Edward Higgings] as Sgt Bolton
 Joyce Gregg as Mrs Santor
 Harry Ross as Bristow
 Vera Day as Sally
 Peter Wayn as Jack Venner
 Alexander Field as Fair Attendant
 Joy Webster as Judy
 David Lawton as Man in Club
 John Tinn as Lascar
 Maxwell Foster as Inspector Brownlow
 Peter Lewiston as Sgt Freeman
 Roger Avon as Constable
The Internet Movie Data Base (IMDb) lists the following as uncredited actors: Shief Ashanti as Witch Doctor (snake-handler); Marie Devereux as Prostitute; John Grant as Rescue Party Leader; Susan Neill as Orange-Juice Counter Girl; and Stanley Platts as Explorers Club Steward. IMDb also notes that Peter Wayn is a pseudonym for Peter Forbes-Robinson.

Production 
The Woman Eater was the second movie by Coen and Saunders that Coulouris starred in, following 1957's The Man Without a Body. The Woman Eater was filmed at Twickenham Studios in Sussex while some scenes were shot outside the studio.

For example, American film critic Bill Warren points out a sequence shot on the streets of London in which Moran goes 'on the prowl' for another woman to feed to the tree. 'The scenes were actually shot at night and seem to have been filmed from concealment with Coulouris and the young woman playing his prey [Joy Webster] moving through real crowds'.

There was also an unusual setback as production was about to begin, According to British film critic John Hamilton, 'the already tight budget was stretched to breaking-point by an accidental fire just before shooting started which reduced the original tree to cinders and left the prop department a matter of days to construct the unsatisfactory alternative'.

Release 
The Woman Eater was released in the UK in April 1958 as Womaneater on an 'unashamedly exploitative double bill with Blonde in Bondage', a Swedish crime drama from 1957. It was double-billed in the US in July 1959 with The H-Man, a 1958 Japanese science fiction film. In the UK, The Woman Eater was given an X-certificate from the British Board of Film Censors (BBFC), which meant it could not be exhibited to people age 16 or younger. However, the film appears to have been promoted as a children's movie in the US. BoxOffice magazine recommended to exhibitors that they target the film to 'the kiddie matinee in larger houses or the smaller neighbourhoods and drive-ins that draw a large percentage of children'.

In Sept. 1963, Screen Gems syndicated the film to American television stations as part of its "X" package of science fiction and horror films.

The film's release in the UK was handled by Eros Films and in the US by Columbia Pictures. It was released for home viewing is in the US in a widescreen Region 1 DVD format from Image Entertainment in 2000.

The Woman Eater has been referred to on videos and television programmes a handful of times over the years. A DVD 'consisting only of movie trailers', including The Woman Eater, was released in the US under the title 42nd Street Forever, Vol.2: The Deuce in October 2006 and the movie trailer as it appears on the DVD was itself reviewed on the American TV programme The Cinema Snob on 24 August 2013. A poster for the film can be found on the DVD Inside the Tower, which was released by Nucleus Films in the UK and world-wide by Odeon Entertainment in 2015. An episode of the British TV programme Talkies, called 'Vera Day Presents ... Her Life in Film', was telecast on 29 October 2016.

Critical reception
Reviews written at the time The Woman Eater opened in the US seem to be scarce. Warren cites only two reviews from the period and writes that 'no-one seems to have liked the film'. According to him, The Hollywood Reporter called it 'a slow-paced entry that attempts ineffectually to generate more than moderate suspense', while The Motion Picture Herald referred to it as 'hardly the type of horror film that will have audiences screaming in the aisles'. Similarly, 'Whit', writing in the 10 June 1959 issue of Variety, said that the film 'is unable to overcome an old-hat plot carelessly put together'. He called the direction 'static', said Coulouris over-acts his role and that Vera Day 'has little to do but be terrified'. At the same time, BoxOffice in its 'Review Digest' rated the film as 'very poor'. British academic film historians Stephan Chibnall and Brian McFarlane note that Coen 'dismissed [the film] as "rubbish"'.

Reviews by more recent critics are a mixed bag. British critic Phil Hardy calls The Woman Eater 'an improbable shocker' and writes that 'the direction, acting and scripting are all questionable and totally lack the silliness required to get away with such a motif, best seen in Roger Corman's Little Shop of Horrors (1960) with its carnivorous piece of flora'. At the other end of the spectrum, American critic Bryan Senn gives Saunders a nod for doing much with little. 'Though the production is definitely on the cheap, director Charles Saunders makes the most of both the English countryside (often going outside to shoot to give the picture a more expansive - and authentic - feel) and the huge old manor house that stood in for Moran's mansion', he writes. He compliments the film's art director, Herbert Smith, for his 'bang-up basement/dungeon lab set, its medieval-style stone staircase, pillars, dank walls and iron gates contrasting nicely with the tables of shining glass beakers and medical apparatus, generating an atmosphere of ominous menace'. Unlike Senn, however, the anonymous reviewer in BoxOffice magazine's 'Feature Review' in 1959 was unimpressed by the laboratory set with its 'dark and dingy brick-walled basements and hundreds of bubbling or smoking test tubes and other similar laboratory paraphernalia'. Warren refers to the direction as 'ponderous' and says it 'makes a slow story painfully halting, in a point-by-point plodding technique of showing all actions'.

Several critics has discussed the carnivorous tree and its victims which are at the centre of The Woman Eater.  Author Jessica Page Morrell describes the tree as a "phallic monster  dozens of writhing snakes, and when a woman was tossed into its embrace, she would die, struggling and screaming in terror". Senn makes note of the "exploitative factor" of the movie, writing that Saunders employed "the occasional plant's-eye view shot to enhance the horror (as well as to provide an additional voyeuristic glimpse at the invariably luscious and semi-draped victim-to-be)". As Hamilton points out, though, "how the girls are actually killed or even more fundamental questions such as how an 8-foot killer tree escaped the attentions of HM Customs in the first place, are never allowed to get in the way of cheap thrills." Warren is quite harsh about the treatment of women in the film, writing that "this is one of the most misogynist movies I've ever seen. Beginning with the premise (it is clearly not a man-eating tree), right until the end, when Sally can't even leave the vault without the help of a man, almost everything in the film indicates if not a hatred of women, but at least a totally uncaring attitude. Women are beauty objects or things to be used and discarded, such as Margaret and the tree's victims".

In The Radio Times, David McGillivray gave the film one star, and wrote, 'fans of mad scientists and killer vegetables should on no account miss this little-known Z-grade affair, a British studio's successful attempt to match similar trash that was coming out of Hollywood in the late 1950s ... Director Charles Saunders began his career with the charming wartime comedy Tawny Pipit and ended it with horror and cheap sleaze. Coulouris was in Citizen Kane. Their conversations in the studio canteen must have been particularly melancholic'.

David Maine of PopMatters rated the film at 6/10 stars and called it 'campy fun', while 389 voters at IMDb.com have given the film a score of 4.6/10.

References

External links

 

1958 films
1958 horror films
British horror films
British black-and-white films
Mad scientist films
1950s monster movies
British monster movies
Films about trees
Films set in country houses
1950s English-language films
1950s British films